Michael Eamon James Kelly (born 3 November 1997) is a Scottish professional footballer who plays as a defender for Eastleigh.

Club career

Early career
Kelly started his career at Aberdeen before moving to Leicester City in 2015. He was then released and spent time playing for Scottish Junior League side Hurlford United. In March 2017, he went on trial with Stoke City, playing twice for their under-23 side.

Bristol Rovers
On 1 July 2017, Kelly signed for League One side Bristol Rovers. In December 2017, he joined National League South side Bath City on loan and went on to make four appearances in all competitions.
On 7 April 2018, Kelly made his league debut for Bristol Rovers, playing the last 13 minutes in a 1–1 draw with Charlton Athletic. In May 2020, Kelly signed a new contract with Rovers to extend his stay at the club for a further year. Kelly's time at the club ended at the conclusion of the 2020-21 season when it was announced that his contract would not be being renewed.

Yeovil Town (loan)
On 26 January 2021, Kelly joined National League side Yeovil Town on loan until the end of the 2020–21 season. On 30 January, Kelly made his Yeovil debut, playing the entirety of a 3–1 victory over Dover Athletic.

Eastleigh
On 29 June 2021, Kelly joined National League side Eastleigh on a permanent deal. On 30 April 2022, Kelly scored a first senior goal with an equalising penalty in the eleventh minute of additional time to earn a 3–3 draw with King's Lynn Town.

International career
Kelly has played for Scotland at under-15, under-16 and under-17 level.

Career statistics

References

External links

Living people
1997 births
Scottish footballers
Scotland youth international footballers
Hurlford United F.C. players
Bristol Rovers F.C. players
Bath City F.C. players
Yeovil Town F.C. players
Eastleigh F.C. players
Scottish Junior Football Association players
National League (English football) players
English Football League players
Scottish expatriate footballers
Expatriate footballers in England
Footballers from Kilmarnock
Association football defenders